Władysław Ekielski (17 February 1855 – 23 June 1927) was a Polish architect active in Kraków, known for his work in the eclectic and modern style.

Biography 
Ekielski was born and raised in Kraków. He came from a bourgeois family. His father Eustachy Ekielski was a notary, and his mother was Elżbieta née Sieradzka.

He attended the St Ann's Gymnasium. Between 1872–1876 he studied at the Institute of Technology in Kraków, and between 1876–1880 at the Construction Department of Vienna Polytechnic. After the graduation, he worked in the studio of Heinrich von Ferstel in Vienna.

In 1882 he came back to Kraków and began work with Tadeusz Stryjeński, initially as an employee, later as his partner. Together, they performed a number of competition projects in Kraków, some of which has been implemented, including the Wołodkowicze Palace in the 1880s, the Pusłowscy Palace in 1886 and the Aleksander Lubomirski Foundation Hospice (currently the main building of the Kraków University of Economics) in 1893.

In 1886, Ekielski obtained building license and started teaching as a lecturer at the Kraków Municipal School of Applied Arts (Miejska Szkoła Przemysłu Artystycznego). He was also a teacher of drawing at the k.k. College of Industry in Kraków (Wyższa Szkoła Przemysłowa).
 
He made projects of tenement houses at Karmelicka Street 42, Studencka Street 14, Szpitalna Street 4, Grodzka Street 26 and Piłsudskiego Street 14. At Piłsudskiego Street 40, he designed his own house called A House With Two Fronts. He also authored Willa Julia in Podgórze in 1903, and Suski House at Grodzka Street 24–26 in 1906–1909.

He carried out architectural work on the construction of the Adam Mickiewicz Monument at the Kraków Main Square, and completed the construction of the New Synagogue in Tarnów.

In the course of renovations carried out since 1895 at the presbytery and the nave of the Franciscan Church in Kraków, he made a discovery of the original plan of the building. Later, he offered Stanisław Wyspiański to execute the polychromy of the interior of the Church.

In 1900, he co-created and became the editor-in-chief of the monthly magazine The Architect (Architekt). In the years 1904–1906, together with Wyspiański, he developed a design for the reconstruction of the Wawel Hill, known as Akropolis. This project has never been implemented. In 1902, together with Antoni Tuch, he set up a stained-glass plant, which in time was transformed into the Kraków Stained-Glass Plant S. G. Żeleński (Krakowski Zakład Witrażów S. G. Żeleński).

Since 1918, Ekielski was a professor at the Jan Matejko Academy of Fine Arts.

On 2 May 1922 he was awarded the Officer's Cross of the Order of Polonia Restituta.

In 1896 he married Zofia Stiasny. They had three sons and two daughters.

He died in 1927, and was buried at the Rakowicki Cemetery.

Projects (selection)

Written works

References 

Architects from Kraków
TU Wien alumni
Academic staff of the Jan Matejko Academy of Fine Arts
Burials at Rakowicki Cemetery
Officers of the Order of Polonia Restituta
1855 births
1927 deaths